Hanson station is an MBTA Commuter Rail station in Hanson, Massachusetts. It serves the Plymouth/Kingston Line, It is located off Main Street (Massachusetts Route 27) in the South Hanson village. It has one full-length high-level platform serving the line's single track and is fully accessible.

History

The Old Colony Railroad opened through South Hanson in November 1845, with Hanson station located at Main Street. The station burned two weeks later, and an exact replica was constructed. The station was renamed South Hanson on June 24, 1878. The New Haven Railroad ended its remaining Old Colony Division service, including commuter service to South Hanson, on June 30, 1959. The former station building remains intact, though unused.

On September 29, 1997, the MBTA restored commuter rail service on the two Old Colony Lines, part of the former Old Colony Railroad system. Hanson station was opened at the former South Hanson station site.

References

External links
MBTA - Hanson
Station from Google Maps Street View

MBTA Commuter Rail stations in Plymouth County, Massachusetts
Railway stations in the United States opened in 1997
Railway stations in the United States opened in 1845